Glutamicibacter ardleyensis is a psychrotrophic and rod-coccus bacterium from the genus Glutamicibacter.

References

External links
Type strain of Glutamicibacter ardleyensis at BacDive -  the Bacterial Diversity Metadatabase

Bacteria described in 2005
Micrococcaceae